Admiral Christian may refer to:

Arthur Christian (1863–1926), British Royal Navy admiral
Hood Hanway Christian (1784–1849), British Royal Navy rear admiral
Hugh Cloberry Christian (1747–1798), British Royal Navy rear admiral
Derek Christian